Margrave William of Baden-Baden (30 July 1593 – 22 May 1677) was the ruler of Baden-Baden between 1621 and 1677.

Life
Born in Baden-Baden, he was the eldest son of Margrave Edward Fortunatus of Baden and Maria of Eicken. He was Geheimrat, Generalfeldmarschall and Imperial Kammerrichter of Speyer, which gave him his nickname: Wilhelm der Kammerrichter. Wilhelm was also a Knight in the Order of the Golden Fleece.

He raised his grandson and successor Ludwig Wilhelm.

Wilhelm only received the Regency of Baden after the victory of Johann Tserclaes, Count of Tilly in the Battle of Wimpfen over Georg Friedrich, Margrave of Baden-Durlach, whose brother Ernst Friedrich had occupied Baden-Baden in 1594.

During the Regency of Wilhelm, Baden suffered from a terrible witch-hunt. Between 1626 and 1631, some 244 people, mostly women, were charged and 231 were condemned and burned in the Baden-Baden witch trials.

In 1631, Wilhelm lost Baden to the Swedish General Gustav Horn and regained control only after the Peace of Prague (1635) and the Peace of Westphalia on 24 October 1648. During this fighting, Wilhelm was taken prisoner, but not recognized and released as an ordinary soldier.

He died in Baden-Baden in 1677.

Family 
First marriage: Wilhelm married on 13 October 1624 Princess Catherine Ursula of Hohenzollern-Hechingen (died 2 June 1640), daughter of Count John George of Hohenzollern-Hechingen.
 Ferdinand Maximilian, Hereditary Prince of Baden-Baden (1625–1669), father of the famous general Louis William, Margrave of Baden-Baden.
 Leopold Wilhelm (1626–1671), Imperial field marshal
 Philipp Siegmund (1627–1647), Knight Hospitaller
 William Christopher (1628–1652), Canon at Cologne
 Hermann (1628–1691)
 Bernhard (1629–1648)
 Isabella Eugenie Klara (1630–1632)
 Catharina Franziska Henriette (1631–1691), a nun
 Claudia (1633–1633)
 Henriette (1634–1634)
 Anna (1634–1708)
 Maria (1636–1636)
 Francis (1637–1637)
 Maria Juliane (1638–1638)

Second marriage: Wilhelm I married in 1650 Countess Maria Magdalena of Oettingen-Baldern (1619–31 August 1688), daughter of Count Ernst of Oettingen-Baldern.
 Philipp Franz Wilhelm (1652–1655)
 Maria Anna Wilhelmine (1655–1701), married Ferdinand August, Prince of Lobkowicz
 Karl Bernhard (1657–1678), KIA at Rheinfelden
 Eva
 Maria

Ancestors

References 

Margraves of Baden-Baden
Roman Catholic monarchs
German Roman Catholics
17th-century German people
House of Zähringen
1593 births
1677 deaths
People from Baden-Baden